Mali Air Transport is a defunct charter airline based in Bamako, Mali. Its main base was Bamako–Sénou International Airport.

Fleet
The Mali Air Transport fleet included the following aircraft  in May 2008:

1 Boeing 727-200 (which is operated for the Government of Mali)

References

Defunct airlines of Mali
Airlines with year of establishment missing
Defunct charter airlines
Companies based in Bamako